Ryan Roslansky (born December 4, 1977 in South Lake Tahoe, California) is an American entrepreneur. He is the chief executive officer (CEO) of LinkedIn, a business-related social networking website, since June 2020 stepping up from his previous position as Senior Vice President.  He started with LinkedIn in 2009 and was instrumental in the $1.5 billion acquisition of Lynda.com in 2015, the largest acquisition in LinkedIn's history at that time.  In 2021, he was named to Forbes CEO Next list.

Career 
Roslansky left college in his sophomore year to focus full time on the company he and two roommates created. He became CEO of the company, Housing Media, and in 1999 it was acquired by USHousing.com. He went to Yahoo!, where he met and worked under Jeff Weiner for five years.  After a short stint at Glam Media, Roslansky went to LinkedIn in 2009 as one of Weiner's first hires. Weiner named Roslansky his replacement as LinkedIn CEO on February 5, 2020.

LinkedIn 
In June 2020, Roslansky was named CEO of LinkedIn, replacing predecessor Jeff Weiner. Ryan joined the company in May 2009 and held leadership roles in every part of LinkedIn’s business. He led the evolution of LinkedIn’s products into a global ecosystem of more than 756 million members, 57 million companies, 120 thousand schools, and 38 thousand skills. He launched several new initiatives for the company including the Influencer program (which includes Richard Branson, Arianna Huffington, and Bill Gates, among others,) and founded the editorial team which today boasts 75+ writers and editors.  In 2015, Roslansky was a key part of the $1.5 billion acquisition of Lynda.com, the largest acquisition in LinkedIn's history at that time.

In response to the Covid-19 pandemic, Microsoft and Linkedin pledged to upskill 25 million workers and in 2021, has surpassed that number.

In 2021, Roslansky partnered with John Kerry on an effort to address Climate Change through a focus on job creation.

The Great Reshuffle 
In 2021, Roslansky coined the term Great Reshuffle to describe talent shifts occurring through data on the LinkedIn platform.

Other interests 
Roslansky is an investor and advisor to companies including Wealthfront, NerdWallet, UserTesting, Deal.com, Cricket Health, Darwin Homes, Fortella, ScoreBeyond, and more. He is also on the board of directors of GoDaddy.

References 

American company founders
21st-century American businesspeople
Businesspeople from California
People from South Lake Tahoe, California
LinkedIn people
Yahoo! people
1977 births
Living people